The Treatise on the Faith and Practice of the Free Will Baptists is a document that outlines the basic doctrines, faith and practices of Free Will Baptists.

The treatise was adopted in 1935 in Nashville, Tennessee as the two largest groups of Free Will Baptists merged to form the National Association of Free Will Baptists.  .

Under the treatise, church government takes place at the congregational level. Local congregations voluntarily join local, state and national associations in order to facilitate missions, association colleges, new church planning and other activities 

The treatise, is not binding on the member congregations  The Treatise describes the common beliefs and practices that bind the churches and most churches are expected to adopt the Treatise as a "Church Covenant."

Notes and references

External links 
Treatise of the Faith and Practices of the Free Will Baptists

Free Will Baptists
History of Christianity in the United States
Baptist statements of faith
1935 in Christianity
Treatises